This was the first edition of the tournament.

Mats Moraing won the title after defeating Hugo Gaston 6–2, 6–1 in the final.

Seeds

Draw

Finals

Top half

Bottom half

References

External links
Main draw
Qualifying draw

NÖ Open - 1